Chadrac Akolo (born 1 April 1995) is a Congolese professional footballer who plays as midfielder for Swiss club St. Gallen and the DR Congo national team.

Early life and childhood
Born in the DR Congo, Akolo left the country with his family due to the political upheaval there and journeyed across the Mediterranean, arriving in Switzerland at age 14. It was there he caught the eye of FC Sion of the Swiss Super League.

Club career
On 1 February 2016, Kinshasa-born Akolo joined Neuchâtel Xamax on loan until the end of the 2015–16 season.

On 9 July 2017, Akolo signed a four-year-deal with VfB Stuttgart.

In July 2019, he moved to Amiens SC.

He joined SC Paderborn on loan until the end of the season in February 2021.

On 3 July 2022, Akolo moved to St. Gallen in Switzerland on a two-year contract.

International career
Akolo made his debut for the DR Congo national football team in a 2–2 2018 FIFA World Cup qualification tie with Tunisia on 5 September 2017.

International goals
Scores and results list DR Congo's goal tally first, score column indicates score after each Akolo goal.

References

External links
 

1995 births
Living people
Footballers from Kinshasa
Association football midfielders
Democratic Republic of the Congo footballers
Democratic Republic of the Congo international footballers
FC Sion players
Neuchâtel Xamax FCS players
VfB Stuttgart players
Amiens SC players
SC Paderborn 07 players
FC St. Gallen players
Swiss Super League players
Swiss Challenge League players
Bundesliga players
Ligue 1 players
Ligue 2 players
2. Bundesliga players
2019 Africa Cup of Nations players
21st-century Democratic Republic of the Congo people
Democratic Republic of the Congo expatriate footballers
Expatriate footballers in Switzerland
Democratic Republic of the Congo expatriate sportspeople in Switzerland
Expatriate footballers in Germany
Democratic Republic of the Congo expatriate sportspeople in Germany
Expatriate footballers in France
Democratic Republic of the Congo expatriate sportspeople in France